Annie Laurie Gaylor (born November 2, 1955) is an American atheist, secular and women's rights activist and a co-founder of – and, with her husband Dan Barker, a current co-president of – the Freedom From Religion Foundation. She was also the editor of the organization's newspaper, Freethought Today (published ten times per year) until 2015. Gaylor is the author of several books, including Woe to the Women: The Bible Tells Me So, Betrayal of Trust: Clergy Abuse of Children and, as editor, Women Without Superstition: No GodsNo Masters.

Biography 
Gaylor graduated from the University of Wisconsin–Madison's School of Journalism in 1980.

In 1977, Gaylor along with her mother (Anne Nicol Gaylor) and feminist groups, spearheaded the protest that led to the recall of Judge Archie Simonson after he had made a statement blaming a young girl for her rape.

Gaylor and her late mother, Anne Nicol Gaylor, and the late John Sontarck, founded the Freedom From Religion Foundation (FFRF) in a meeting around the Gaylors' dining room table in 1978. Gaylor has worked to make the FFRF the largest organization of atheists and agnostics in the United States.

Gaylor is also on the Board of Directors of the Women's Medical Fund, Inc., a group that helps women pay for abortion services. She has been involved in other protests including: protesting abortion restrictions in South Dakota, protesting perceived judicial misconduct in Wisconsin, and speaking out against gun violence.

In 2010, Gaylor received the Humanitarian Heroine award from the American Humanist Association. Gaylor has been an invited speaker at conferences including the 2012 Global Atheist Convention in Melbourne, Australia, and the regional conference of the Minnesota Atheists. She is on the speakers bureau of the Secular Student Alliance.

Media appearances 

Gaylor has appeared in numerous print, radio and television media discussing the work of the FFRF, such as an advertising campaign being censored in Las Vegas and the case against the National Day of Prayer.

Gaylor contributes writings to print media across the United States on women's issues: how politics affects women's access to reproductive health care in the state of Wisconsin, the arrest of the Tunisian woman Amina Tyler for posting a nude photo of herself, the 50-year anniversary of the publication of The Feminine Mystique, and the state of women's rights around the world since the Seneca Convention.

Gaylor, along with her husband Dan Barker, hosts a weekly one-hour radio program Freethought Radio. It is broadcast weekly, on Progressive Talk The Mic 92.1, out of Madison, Wisconsin. It is carried on several other stations throughout the Midwest and is available through podcast.

Personal life 
Gaylor met Barker when both were guests on AM Chicago, hosted by Oprah Winfrey, in 1984. They began dating six months later and married in 1987. They have a daughter, Sabrina Delata.

Publications 
Author

Editor

References

External links 

 Freedom From Religion Foundation

1955 births
Living people
American feminists
American atheism activists
Atheist feminists
Freethought writers
Writers from Madison, Wisconsin
People from Monroe County, Wisconsin
University of Wisconsin–Madison School of Journalism & Mass Communication alumni
20th-century atheists
21st-century atheists
Writers about religion and science